Jungle Raiders may refer to:

 Jungle Raiders (serial), a 1945 serial film
 Jungle Raiders (1985 film), a 1985 film by Antonio Margheriti